Deborah, Lady Moody (born Deborah Dunch) (1586– circa 1659) is notable as the founder of Gravesend, Brooklyn, and is the only woman known to have started a village in colonial America. She was the first known female landowner in the New World. As a wealthy titled woman, she had unusual influence in New Netherland, where she was respected. In the Massachusetts Bay Colony, where she had first settled after leaving England because of persecution as an Anabaptist, she had been described by contemporaries as "a dangerous woman" and chose excommunication over giving up her beliefs.

Biography
Deborah Dunch was born in London in 1586, the daughter of Walter Dunch of Avebury Manor in Wiltshire and his wife, also called Deborah. The elder Deborah was the daughter of James Pilkington, Bishop of Durham and his wife. Walter's father was Sir William Dunch, the Auditor of the Royal Mint.

Deborah married Sir Henry Moody, 1st Baronet, in 1606. By marriage she was entitled to be addressed as Lady Moody. She was widowed by 1629, after her husband died at age 46.

Lady Moody left England in 1639 due to religious persecution, as she had adopted Anabaptist beliefs. At the age of 54, she settled in the town of Saugus, Massachusetts. She moved to a large farm in Swampscott, just outside of Salem. She corresponded with other religious Nonconformists in the area, attracting negative attention from her closest neighbor, Reverend Hugh Peter. Peter believed in religious unity in the Massachusetts Puritan colony. He had already expelled Anne Hutchinson, another Anabaptist woman, two years prior to Moody's arrival. In 1643, Moody was put on trial for allegedly spreading religious dissent. Puritan leader John Endecott described her as a "dangerous woman", during her trial. The Church told her to change her beliefs or be excommunicated.

Moody chose excommunication. She gathered her fellow Anabaptists, and set out once again to find a place where they could peacefully practice their religion. In 1643, Director Willem Kieft of the Dutch West India Company was looking for new settlers to add to the population in New Netherland. He had recently started a war with the local Lenape and wanted more settlers to defend the newly seized land. Lady Moody had money and followers, and accepted the opportunity to create a new community.

Since the Netherlands and their colonies had policies of relative religious tolerance, in order to encourage trade, Moody's Anabaptist beliefs presented less of a problem. The Dutch West India Company entrusted Moody with the southwestern tip of Long Island. This includes the areas now known as parts of Bensonhurst, Coney Island, Brighton Beach, and Sheepshead Bay. Moody named her new community Gravesend. Gravesend was the first New World settlement founded by a woman. Moody allowed total religious freedom in Gravesend, as long as it fell within the laws of the colony.

As Gravesend prospered, Moody gained influence in the government of New Netherland. She was among the few prominent settlers invited to greet the new Director-General, Peter Stuyvesant, when he arrived in 1647. Stuyvesant called on her to mediate a tax dispute in 1654. In 1655, she was called upon to nominate magistrates for Gravesend. Moody lived in Gravesend until her death in 1659.

Today, Gravesend, as its name became known, is part of Brooklyn in New York City, with the original town square still evident in the street layout. It is named Lady Moody Square (see photo) in honor of the founder.

In the fall of 2014, Moody was honored for founding the town of Gravesend in "Built by Women New York City", a competition launched by the Beverly Willis Architecture Foundation. It identified outstanding and diverse sites and spaces designed, engineered and built by women. A memorial was erected to her at Lady Moody Square, named in her honor in Gravesend.

References

Further reading
 Biemer, Linda Briggs. Women and Property in Colonial New York: The Transition from Dutch to English Law, 1643–1727 (Ann Arbor: UMI, 1983). xiii+ 155 pp. 
 Campanella, Thomas J. "Sanctuary in the wilderness: Deborah Moody and the town plan for colonial Gravesend." Landscape Journal 12#2 (1993): 107-130.
 Cooper, Victor H. A Dangerous Woman: New York's First Lady Liberty; The Life and Times of Lady Deborah Moody; Her Search for Freedom of Religion in Colonial America (Bowie, MD: Heritage Books, 1995)

1586 births
1650s deaths
History of Brooklyn
People from Saugus, Massachusetts
People of New Netherland
English emigrants to the United States
People from London
English Anabaptists
Colonial American women
Wives of baronets